Hacienda Atalaya is a village in Acajutla municipality in the Sonsonate Department on the coast of El Salvador.

It is located half a mile from the town of Acajutla itself. Nearby towns and villages include El Amatal (4.4 nm), Suncita (1.9 nm), Hacienda San Pedro (2.2 nm), Hacienda San Antonio (1.9 nm) and 
Club Salinitas (4.1 nm).

References

.

Populated places in El Salvador